Saleh Ali Al-Kharabsheh is the Jordanian Minister of Energy and Mineral Resources. He was appointed as minister on 11 October 2021.

Education 
Kharabsheh holds a Bachelor in Mechanical Engineering (1991) from the University of Burdwan, a Master in Mechanical Engineering (1994) from University of Jordan and a PhD in Renewable Energy (2003) from the University of Florida.

References 

Living people
Jordanian politicians
Energy ministers of Jordan
University of Burdwan alumni
University of Jordan alumni
University of Florida alumni
Year of birth missing (living people)